Burakabad (also Romanized as Būrakābād and Būrkābād) is a village in Satar Rural District, Kolyai District, Sonqor County, Kermanshah Province, Iran. At the 2006 census, its population was 156, in 35 families.

References 

Populated places in Sonqor County